Eva Santolaria Millán (born 2 May 1975) is a Spanish actress born in Barcelona.

She left law school to make her début as an actress in the TV3 series Nissaga de poder. Her starring role in Compañeros, a TV series of Antena 3, and in 7 Vidas of Telecinco made her one of the most popular young Spanish actresses.

Filmography

Movies

Films

Short films

Television

References

External links

1975 births
Living people
Spanish television actresses
Actresses from Barcelona
20th-century Spanish actresses
21st-century Spanish actresses